Paul Logan may refer to:
 Paul Logan (colonel), US army colonel and inventor of the emergency chocolate ration 
 Paul Logan (actor) (born 1973), American actor

See also
 Logan Paul (born 1995), American YouTube personality, actor, and professional wrestler